Vaathiyaar Veettu Pillai is a 1989 Indian Tamil-language film, directed by P. Vasu. It stars Sathyaraj and Shobana. This was Sathyaraj's 100th film as an actor. Vaathiyaar Veettu Pillai was released on 28 October 1989, alongside another Sathyaraj film Dravidan. It was commercially unsuccessful. The film was a remake of Kannada film Nammoora Raja for which Vasu written the story.

Plot 
A corrupt landlord's plan of constructing a chemical factory is foiled by Thangaraj. Things take a turn when Thangaraj falls in love with the landlord's daughter. Thangaraj's family gets affected by the landlord. The rest of the film revolves how Thangaraj thwarts the plans of the landlord and saves his family.

Cast 
 Sathyaraj as Thangaraj
 Shobana as Geeta
 Raasi as Gowri
 Rajesh as Gowri's father
 Goundamani as Chinna Muthu
 Nassar as Gowri's husband
 Srividya as Gowri's mother
 Bheeman Raghu
 Mohan Natarajan
 Chandranath
 Annapoorna

Soundtrack 
The music was composed by Ilaiyaraaja.

Release and reception 
Vaathiyaar Veettu Pillai was released on 28 October 1989, alongside another Sathyaraj film Dravidan. P. S. S. of Kalki lamented the fact that Sathyaraj's 100th film was underwhelming. The film was a box office failure.

References

External links 
 

1980s Tamil-language films
1989 films
Films directed by P. Vasu
Films scored by Ilaiyaraaja
Tamil remakes of Kannada films
Indian drama films